The John Quincy Adams was a named train of the New York, New Haven & Hartford Railroad, between New York, New York and Boston, Massachusetts. The John Quincy Adams was an attempt by the New Haven to modernize rail travel and lure people out of their cars. The train was built by American Car and Foundry to a lightweight Talgo design, and was powered by two Fairbanks-Morse P-12-42 Diesel-electric locomotives, one at each end of the train, connected by multiple unit control.

The train consisted of five sections, each made up of three short cars articulated together. The center car of each section had two axles (one at each end), with the remaining cars having a single axle each, being supported by adjacent cars at the end opposite the axle. The ride was rough, as with most of the other lightweight trains of the period, and the train was not a success.

The train was sold in 1962 to the Ferrocarril de Langreo in Spain, where it was used until 1983. The locomotives remained unused after that sale of the train, and were scrapped in 1971.

See also 

 Speed Merchant

Footnotes

References 
 

Talgo
North American streamliner trains
Passenger trains of the New York, New Haven and Hartford Railroad
Named passenger trains of the United States
Articulated passenger trains
Fairbanks-Morse